Gladiogobius is a genus of gobies native to the Indian and western Pacific oceans.

Species
There are currently three recognized species in this genus:
 Gladiogobius brevispinis Shibukawa & G. R. Allen, 2007 (Short-spined goby)
 Gladiogobius ensifer Herre, 1933 (Gladiator goby)
 Gladiogobius rex Shibukawa & G. R. Allen, 2007 (King goby)

References

Gobiidae